The 2022 European Youth Summer Olympic Festival was held in Banská Bystrica, Slovakia, between 24 and 30 July 2022.

Host selection
Košice was originally to be host city but withdrew from the hosting in April 2019 due to financial concerns. Banská Bystrica was chosen as the new host city in May 2019. Originally scheduled to run from 24 July to 1 August 2021, on 7 May 2020 it was announced that the games will be moved to 2022 as a result of the COVID-19 pandemic.

Sports
The following competitions took place:

Venues

Schedule
The competition schedule for the 2022 European Youth Olympic Summer Festival was as follows:

Participant nations
A total of 2,252 athletes from 48 NOCs competed at these games. One refugee athlete, originally from Syria, and at that time based in Austria, also competed. As a result of the 2022 Russian invasion of Ukraine, on 2 March 2022, in accordance with a recommendation by the International Olympic Committee (IOC), EOC suspended the participation of Belarus and Russia from 2022 European Youth Summer Olympic Festival.

Medal table

References

External links

Schedule and Results

 
European Youth Summer Olympic Festival
Multi-sport events in Slovakia
European Youth Summer Olympic Festival
Youth sport in Slovakia
European Youth Summer Olympic Festival
European Youth Summer Olympic Festival
Youth Summer Olympic Festival
European Youth Summer Olympic Festival
European Youth Summer Olympic Festival
European Youth Summer Olympic Festival
Sport in Banská Bystrica